The Woodlark Plate is a small tectonic plate located in the eastern half of the island of New Guinea. It subducts beneath the Caroline plate along its northern border while the Maoke Plate converges on the west, the Australian plate converges on the south, and on the east an undefined compressive zone which may be a transform fault marking the boundary with the adjoining Solomon Sea Plate.
It also contacts the South Bismarck Plate due northeast.

See also

References
 

Tectonic plates
Geology of the Pacific Ocean